Simplot Games is an indoor track and field meet in the western United States, one of the nation's premier high school events. Held annually in February at Holt Arena, on the campus of Idaho State University in Pocatello, Idaho, it is sponsored by the J.R. Simplot Company. 

More than 1,500 athletes from over 20 states and Canada travel to the Simplot Games, held on the weekend of the third Saturday in February. The Games were first held  in 1979, and Holt Arena’s unique 200-meter banked-board track is one of the fastest  in North America. Records have been broken regularly since the track debuted in the early 1970s.

At the Simplot Games, high school athletes get the chance to mingle with guest Olympic legends such as honorary chairman Dick Fosbury. The Games also offers recognition for all participants with the Parade of Athletes, an Olympic-style event.  The Games are unique among national events because it is an open meet, which means athletes do not need a certain qualifying time or distance to be able to compete. All high school age athletes are welcome at the Simplot Games, giving students from all over the chance to compete, and admission is free.

Meet Management

Honorary Chairperson of the Simplot Games 

Dick Fosbury

Executive committee

History 

In 1979 Simplot Games was just a small regional track meet. Today it is one of the nation’s premier high school track and field events. The Games have come a long way. Every year Simplot Games has continued old traditions while adding new features that make it the event that it is today.

Milestones

J.R. “Jack” Simplot’s contribution and dedication to Simplot Games 
John Richard “Jack” Simplot was an enthusiastic supporter of Simplot Games and regularly attended the Games on Saturdays to view the ceremonies and final events. He enjoyed mingling with the high school participants, shaking hands and encouraging them to do well on the track and in school, and sharing one of his secrets to success: “Stay with it and just do your best.”

He recognized the similarity in finding success in business and on the track: hard work, vision, the willingness to take risks, and the ability to overcome the odds.

And Jack Simplot, who launched his empire at the age of 14, no doubt recognized the potential in each of the young athletes he greeted.

Ceremonies and Parade of Athletes 
The Ceremonies and Parade of Athletes has been an annual tradition of the Simplot Games. During this Olympic-style event, 2,000 athletes make their way around Idaho State University's historic wood track. Also during the Ceremonies and Parade of Athletes special guest are introduced, national anthems are played, and athletes from each state enjoy their moment in the spotlight.

Meet Records

Boys

Girls

Coaches

Legend: At the Time Set – @ National Record, #Age Group National Record

Media Coverage 
Full event results, news updates, photos and more information can be found at www.simplotgames.com. News and highlights on Simplot Games are available on Twitter, Facebook, and YouTube.
Additional Simplot Games news, results, statistics, and photos, as well as high school track and field news, are online at ESPN Rise DyeStat at http://rise.espn.go.com/track-and-xc/index.aspx.

References

External links
 
 ESPN RISE (DyeStat)
 Facebook
 Twitter
 YouTube

High school track and field competitions in the United States
Idaho State University